José Marcelino Bolivar (born July 14, 1964) is a Venezuelan former professional boxer who competed from 1989 to 1994. He challenged for the IBF mini flyweight title in 1994. As an amateur, he won the bronze medal in the flyweight division at the 1984 Summer Olympics in Los Angeles as well as the 1988 Summer Olympics in Seoul.

Olympic results 
1984
Defeated Nelson Jamili (Philippines) 5-0
Defeated Agapito Gómez (Spain) 4-1
Defeated Carlos Motta (Guatemala) 5-0
Lost to Paul Gonzales (United States) 5-0

1988
1st round bye
Lost to Jesus Beltre (Dominican Republic) 4-1

Professional career
Bolivar made his professional debut on July 28, 1989, and ran into his first defeat after ten consecutive wins against countryman Juan Antonio Torres in the fight for the WBA Fedelatin light flyweight title. Bolivar ended his professional career in 1994, after 21 fights (seventeen wins, four defeats).

External links
 

1964 births
Living people
People from Ciudad Bolívar
Flyweight boxers
Boxers at the 1984 Summer Olympics
Boxers at the 1988 Summer Olympics
Olympic boxers of Venezuela
Olympic bronze medalists for Venezuela
Olympic medalists in boxing
Medalists at the 1984 Summer Olympics
Boxers at the 1983 Pan American Games
Pan American Games competitors for Venezuela
Venezuelan male boxers
Central American and Caribbean Games bronze medalists for Venezuela
Competitors at the 1986 Central American and Caribbean Games
Central American and Caribbean Games medalists in boxing
20th-century Venezuelan people
21st-century Venezuelan people